The Crocodile Trophy is an annual eight-day mountain bike stage race held in North Queensland, Australia. In recent years however the race became more and more accessible. The race is however still known for the heat and the rough terrain of the Australian Outback.

History
The race was originally intended to take place in Vietnam. The event would last 18 days, starting in Saigon and finishing in Hanoi. But after spending two weeks in Vietnam race organisers Gerhard Schönbacher realized it was not possible to organise the event in Vietnam. Later on he found an alternative in Darwin and decided that the first route of the Crocodile Trophy would run from Darwin to Cairns. The race's route would change every year.

Classifications
The Crocodile Trophy's leaders jersey is awarded after each stage to the rider with the lowest overall time. The rider who has the lowest overall time will wear the jersey at the next stage. The cyclist who is awarded the jersey after the final stage is the overall winner of the race.

The first five riders to cross the finish line at each stage will score points that count toward the Points classification. The rider who holds the most points will wear a special jersey.

Winners

Wins per country

References

External links
 Official Site

 
Sports competitions in Queensland